During the 1998–99 English football season, Wimbledon F.C. competed in the FA Premier League.

Season Summary
Wimbledon started the season well, reaching the semi-finals of the League Cup for the second time in their history, and as March arrived Wimbledon was sixth in the table with 11 matches to go. The signing of striker John Hartson from top-five rivals West Ham United for a club record £7.5 million in January looked to be crucial signing the South London club needed for European qualification, but after his arrival the club suffered a slump in form, winning only one more game all season and taking only 2 points from their last 11 games to fall to 16th in the final table, their lowest finish in 13 seasons of top flight football.

Manager Joe Kinnear resigned at the end of the season on health grounds after seven years in charge, having suffered heart problems before a match at Sheffield Wednesday in March. He was succeeded by former Norwegian national coach Egil Olsen, who had frequently spoke of his admiration of Wimbledon and had transformed Norway into a leading international side with long-ball tactics similar to those employed by Kinnear.

Final League Table

Results summary

Results by round

Results
Wimbledon's score comes first

Legend

FA Premier League

FA Cup

League Cup

Players

First-team squad
Squad at end of season

Left club during season

Reserve squad

Transfers

In

Out

Transfers in:  £9,500,000
Transfers out:  £0
Total spending:  £9,500,000

Appearances and goals
Source:
Numbers in parentheses denote appearances as substitute.
Players with names struck through and marked  left the club during the playing season.
Players with names in italics and marked * were on loan from another club for the whole of their season with Burnley.
Players listed with no appearances have been in the matchday squad but only as unused substitutes.
Key to positions: GK – Goalkeeper; DF – Defender; MF – Midfielder; FW – Forward

References

Notes

Wimbledon F.C. seasons
Wimbledon